Down and Dangerous is a 2013 American crime thriller film featuring Ross Marquand and Judd Nelson.

Plot
Always one step ahead of the Feds, Paul Boxer is the most inventive and principled smuggler in the trade, and has never needed to carry a gun. When violent mid-level traffickers coerce him into designing a foolproof plan to bring several kilos of cocaine across the México border, he maneuvers to rid himself of their hold over him once and for all. But when a sharp-witted woman from his past enlists his help to escape this rival outfit, Paul must confront the man that is hunting him down, and choose between his livelihood as a smuggler and his integrity as a man.

Cast
John T. Woods as Paul Boxer
Paulie Rojas as Olivia Ivarra
Ross Marquand as Henry Langlois
Judd Nelson as Charles
Ernest Curcio as Rafael Garza
Dusty Sorg as Elliot Reid
Luis Robledo as DEA Special Agent Arturo Rezendes

Reception
On review aggregator Rotten Tomatoes, the film holds an approval rating of 60% based on 5 reviews, with an average rating of 4.67/10. On Metacritic, the film has a weighted average score of 43 out of 100, based on 4 critics, indicating "mixed or average reviews".

Frank Scheck of The Hollywood Reporter said that "The convoluted, cliché-ridden storyline, apparently inspired by the director’s father’s real-life experiences in the drug trade, is the least interesting element, while the brief, perfunctory action sequences no doubt reflect the low budget. But the film certainly looks and sounds good".

Peter Labuza of Variety wrote "Relying on a synthesized score, over-saturated cinematography and frustratingly cliched dialogue, this is an extremely generic, truly empty tale of a drug smuggler involved with cops and criminals alike."

References

External links

2010s Spanish-language films
American crime thriller films
2010s English-language films
2010s American films